Dallas Landmark is a designation by the City of Dallas and the Dallas Landmark Commission for historic buildings and districts in Dallas, Texas, United States. Listed sites are selected after meeting a combination of criteria, including historical, economic, architectural, artistic, cultural, and social values. Once a structure or district is designated a landmark, it is protected by an ordinance with specific preservation criteria, which require that any alterations beyond routine maintenance, up to and including demolition, must have their permits reviewed by the Landmark Commission.

Criteria

Buildings eligible for Dallas Landmark structure designation are those that possess any of these merits:
Character
Location of a significant historical event
Identification with a historically significant person or persons
Cultural, economic, social, or historical heritage
Architectural style
Architect or master builder
Architectural innovation
Archaeological significance, or value as an aspect of community sentiment or pride

Dallas Landmark districts are defined areas with a significant concentration of structures unified by their architectural style or related historical events.

Many Dallas Landmark structures are eligible or have been recognized as a contributing property on the National Register of Historic Places or Recorded Texas Historic Landmark list. Many of the Dallas Landmark districts fall within other local or national historic districts, as well.

Landmark Commission

The Dallas mayor and city council appoint an 18-member Landmark Commission consisting of one representative for each district and three alternates for a two-year unpaid term beginning on September 1 of each odd-numbered year. All commissioners have knowledge and experience in the fields of history, art, architecture, or historic preservation. The Landmark Commission and City Plan Commission make recommendations for City of Dallas landmarks that are forwarded to the Dallas City Council.

The Designation Committee is an advisory committee appointed by the Landmark Commission made up of Landmark Commissioners and citizens. The combination of historians, architects, archeologists, and preservation consultants is  responsible for reviewing applications for new landmarks and historic districts. The committee reviews applications for new city landmarks and forwards the recommendations to the Landmark Commission.

List of landmarks

For consistency, the lists below use the names from the Dallas Landmark website.

Structures

Districts

See also

 National Register of Historic Places listings in Dallas County, Texas
 History of Dallas

References

External links

 Dallas Landmarks Home Page

 
Locally designated landmarks in the United States
Lists of landmarks
Dallas-related lists